Chalam may refer to:
 Chalam (actor), an actor in Telugu cinema
 Chalam (writer), a writer